NGC 4707 is an irregular galaxy in the constellation of Canes Venatici. It was discovered by John Herschel on 5 June 1834, and was described by John Louis Emil Dreyer, the compiler of the New General Catalogue, as a "small, stellar" galaxy.

NGC 4707 has a morphological type of Sm or Im, meaning that it is mostly irregular or has very weak spiral arms. The galaxy was imaged by the Hubble Space Telescope in 2016. The image showed the galaxy had little to no signs of a central bulge or any prominent structures (typical of Magellanic-type spirals). However, the telescope could resolve many stars, as well as several turquoise-colored star forming regions.

Gallery

References

External links
 

Irregular galaxies
4707
07971
043255
Canes Venatici